Asal Badiee (May 9, 1977 – April 1, 2013) was an Iranian actress.

She started her cinema career with the film To Be or Not to Be, a product of Kianoosh Ayari. The main subject of the film was organ donation; a task which Badiee performed in her real life.

Early life
Asal Badiee was born in Tehranpars, Tehran. Her father, Shahrokh, was an employee at Tejarat Bank.

Personal life
She married Fariborz Arabnia, an Iranian cinema actor and film director in 2000, but they separated after four years; they had one son Johnyar.

Death
She was transferred to Loghman Hospital after a drug overdose on March 31, 2013, and died the next day from cardiac and respiratory problems. Her doctor also announced that she had died after cerebral vessels burst.

Two days after her death, it was announced that her internal organs would be donated, with her family's agreement. Her kidney, liver, heart, and lungs were donated on April 5–6, giving seven people new lives, making her the first Iranian cinema actress to do so.

Her funeral took place on April 7, 2013 at Vahdat Hall, with the participation of a large number of Iranian cinema and television actors and many fans. She was buried in Behesht-e Zahra.

Filmography

Film
To Be or Not to Be, Kianoosh Ayari, 1997
Dirty Hands, Sirus Alvand, 1999
Haft Pardeh, Farzad Motamen, 2000
Dearly, Bahram Kazemi, 2000
Candle in the Wind, Pouran Derakhshandeh, 2003
Butterfly in May, Mohammad-Javad Kazeh Saz, 2005
Sarboland, Saeed Tehrani, 2006

TV Series
Until Morning (2005–06)
8th Day (2009)
Mankind's land (2009–10)
The sixth person (2010–11)
Ghazal (2010)
My father's house (2012)
Walk in the Line (2012)

References

1977 births
2013 deaths
People from Tehran
Actresses from Tehran
Iranian film actresses
Iranian television actresses
Islamic Azad University alumni
Burials at artist's block of Behesht-e Zahra